Franco Perruquet (born 25 December 1950) is an Italian bobsledder who competed in the mid-1970s. He won a gold medal in the two-man event at the 1975 FIBT World Championships in Cervinia.

Perruquet also finished eighth in the two-man event at the 1976 Winter Olympics in Innsbruck.

References
Bobsleigh two-man world championship medalists since 1931
Wallenchinsky, David (1984). "Bobsled: Two-man". In The Complete Book of the Olympics: 1896 - 1980. New York: Penguin Books. p. 559.

Bobsledders at the 1976 Winter Olympics
Italian male bobsledders
Living people
1950 births
Olympic bobsledders of Italy